Anthony Bernard Jones (born December 30, 1965) is a former professional American football player who played wide receiver for four seasons with the Houston Oilers and Atlanta Falcons of the National Football League (NFL).

Jones attended Grapeland High School, where he was a member of the 2A state champion basketball team in 1985. He went on to attend the University of Texas at Austin, where he was an All-American in track and lettered all three seasons that he played football. At the 1987 Southwest Conference championships, Jones ran the 200 m in 20.28 seconds, a record that stood at the University of Texas for 32 years until it was broken in 2019 by Micaiah Harris, who ran a 20.21.

Drafted by the Oilers in the sixth round of the 1990 NFL Draft, Jones was one of the smallest players in the league, weighing as little as 139 lb (63 kg) during his professional career.

References

1965 births
Living people
People from Grapeland, Texas
Players of American football from Texas
American football wide receivers
Texas Longhorns football players
Houston Oilers players
Atlanta Falcons players
Arizona Cardinals players